is a Japanese women's professional shogi player ranked 2-dan. She is a member of the Ladies Professional Shogi-players' Association of Japan.

Women's shogi professional

Promotion history
Uekawa has been promoted as follows.
 Women's Professional Apprentice League: April 1995
 2-kyū: April 1, 1999
 1-kyū: November 30, 1999
 1-dan: April 1, 2003
 2-dan: December 10, 2015

Note: All ranks are women's professional ranks.

Personal life
Uekawa married professional shogi player Ayumu Matsuo in April 2005, and Uekawa announced that she would be competing professionally under her married name. On December 1, 2014, however, the Ladies Professional Shogi-players' Association of Japan announced that Uekawa would no longer be competing under the name "Matsuo".

References

Japanese shogi players
Living people
Women's professional shogi players
LPSA
Professional shogi players from Hiroshima Prefecture
People from Hiroshima Prefecture
1974 births